Lamination paper is a paper used for laminates. Normally on particle or fiberboards giving a good-looking and resistant surface for use as furniture, decoration panels and flooring.

Paper laminations are also used in packaging. For example, juiceboxes are fabricated from liquid packaging board which is usually six layers of paper, polyethylene, and aluminum foil. Paper is used in the lamination to shape the product and give the juicebox an extra source of strength.

Properties
A laminate consists of a single or multiple layers, each having its own distinct function. The base is most often particle- or fiberboards, then some layers of absorbent kraft paper. The last layers are a decor paper covered with an overlay. The lamination papers are covered with an inert resin, often melamine, which is cured to form a hard composite with the structure of paper. The laminates may also have a lining on the back side of laminating kraft to compensate for the tension created by the top side lamination.

Cheaper particle boards may have only a lining of laminating kraft to give surface washability and resistance to wear.

The decor paper can also be processed under heat and low/high pressure to create a melamine laminated sheet, that has several applications.

Absorbent kraft paper
The absorbent kraft paper is a normal kraft paper with controlled absorbency, which means a high degree of porosity. It is made of clean low kappa hardwood kraft with good uniformity. The grammage is 80 - 120 g/m2 and normally 2-4 plies are used.

Decor paper
The decor paper is the most critical of the lamination papers as it gives the visual appearance of the laminate. The impregnation resin and cellulose have about the same refraction index which means that the cellulose fibers of the paper appear as a shade and only the dyestuffs and pigments are visible. Due to this the decor paper demands extreme cleanness and is produced only on small paper machines with grammage 50 - 150 g/m2.

Overlay
The overlay paper have grammage of 18 – 50 m2 and is made of pure cellulose, thus it must be made of well delignified pulp. It becomes transparent after impregnation letting the appearance of the decor paper come through.

Laminating kraft
The laminating kraft have a grammage of 70 - 150 g/m2 and is a smooth dense kraft paper.

See also
 plastic-coated paper
 Process of production
 Types of films (in German)

References

Paper
Building materials
Coated paper